Hellinsia madecasseus is a moth of the family Pterophoridae.

Distribution
It is known from the Democratic Republic of Congo, Kenya, Madagascar, Tanzania, Réunion, South Africa, Uganda and Malawi.

Hostplant
The larvae of this species feeds on Tithonia diversifolia and Acanthospermum hispidum (Asteraceae).

References

madecasseus
Moths of Africa
Moths of Madagascar
Moths described in 1964